The Republic of Moldova first participated at the Olympic Games as an independent nation in 1994, and has sent athletes to compete in every Games since then.

Previously, Moldovan athletes competed as part of the Soviet Union at the Olympics from 1952 to 1988, and after the dissolution of the Soviet Union, Moldova was part of the Unified Team in 1992.

The nation has not won any medals at the Winter Olympic Games.

The National Olympic Committee of the Republic of Moldova  was created in 1991 and recognized by the International Olympic Committee in 1993.

Medal tables

Medals by Summer Games

Medals by Winter Games

Medals by sport

List of medalists

See also
 List of flag bearers for Moldova at the Olympics
 :Category:Olympic competitors for Moldova
 Moldova at the Paralympics

External links